Angkasa Pura (Sanskrit for Sky City) is the name used by two separate state enterprises of the Indonesian Ministry of State Owned Enterprises responsible for the management of airports in Indonesia. The two companies are PT Angkasa Pura I (trading as Angkasa Pura Airports, stylised as AngkasaPura | ) and PT Angkasa Pura II. Angkasa Pura I has its head office in Kemayoran, Jakarta, while Angkasa Pura II has its head office at Soekarno-Hatta International Airport in Tangerang, Banten.

In 2010, PT Angkasa Pura I had airport capacities of 30,700,440 people, while the movement was exceed up to 49,237,437 passengers. Over capacities also occurred for PT Angkasa Pura II with capacities of 30,815,000 people, with movement of 62,215,834 passengers.

Name and legal status 
In 1962, Perusahaan Negara (PN) Angkasa Pura Kemayoran was established after a formal request by president Sukarno. It first started to control operations for the Kemayoran Airport (JKT) in Jakarta. In 1965, PN Angkasa Pura Kemayoran was renamed PN Angkasa Pura. In 1974 it became Perum Angkasa Pura.

Another name change came in 1987, when Perum Angkasa Pura became Perum Angkasa Pura I following the establishment of Perum Pelabuhan Udara Jakarta Cengkareng, which later became Perum Angkasa Pura II. Perum Angkasa Pura II was established to control the operation of Soekarno–Hatta International Airport (CGK) and Halim Perdanakusuma Airport (HLP) in Jakarta.

In 1992, both Perum Angkasa Pura I and Perum Angkasa Pura II were converted into perseroan terbatas under the names PT Angkasa Pura I (Persero) and PT Angkasa Pura II (Persero).

Operations 
Angkasa Pura operates the following airports:
PT. Angkasa Pura I operates airports in central and eastern Indonesia.
 Ngurah Rai International Airport, Denpasar, Bali
 Juanda International Airport, Surabaya, East Java
 Sultan Hasanuddin International Airport, Makassar, South Sulawesi
 Sultan Aji Muhammad Sulaiman International Airport, Balikpapan, East Kalimantan
 Frans Kaisiepo International Airport, Biak, Papua
 Sam Ratulangi International Airport, Manado, North Sulawesi
 Syamsudin Noor International Airport, Banjarbaru, South Kalimantan
 Achmad Yani International Airport, Semarang, Central Java
 Adisucipto International Airport, Yogyakarta, Special Region of Yogyakarta
 Adisumarmo International Airport, Solo, Central Java
 Lombok International Airport, Mataram, West Nusa Tenggara
 Pattimura International Airport, Ambon, Maluku
 El Tari International Airport, Kupang, East Nusa Tenggara
 Yogyakarta International Airport, Kulon Progo, Yogyakarta
 Dortheys Hiyo Eluay International Airport, Jayapura, Papua
PT. Angkasa Pura II operates airports in western Indonesia.
 Soekarno–Hatta International Airport, Tangerang, Banten 
 Halim Perdanakusuma International Airport, Jakarta, Jakarta
 Sultan Mahmud Badaruddin II International Airport, Palembang, South Sumatra
 Supadio International Airport, Kuburaya, West Kalimantan
 Kualanamu International Airport, Medan, North Sumatra
 Sultan Iskandar Muda International Airport, Banda Aceh, Aceh 
 Minangkabau International Airport, Padang, West Sumatra
 Sultan Syarif Kasim II International Airport, Pekanbaru, Riau
 Husein Sastranegara International Airport, Bandung, West Java 
 Raja Haji Fisabilillah International Airport, Tanjung Pinang, Riau Islands
 Depati Amir Airport, Pangkal Pinang, Bangka Belitung Islands
 Sultan Thaha Airport, Jambi, Jambi
 Silangit International Airport, Siborong-Borong, North Sumatra
 Kertajati International Airport, Majalengka, West Java
 Banyuwangi International Airport, Banyuwangi, East Java
 Tjilik Riwut Airport, Palangka Raya, Central Kalimantan
 General Sudirman Airport, Purbalingga, Central Java
 Radin Inten II International Airport, Lampung
 Fatmawati Soekarno Airport, Bengkulu
 H.A.S. Hanandjoeddin International Airport, Tanjung Pandan, Bangka-Belitung Islands

In 2010, Angkasa Pura II made a profit of Rp.1,264 trillion. Seven airports suffered losses, but five made profits. Soekarno Hatta International Airport made a profit of Rp.1,573 trillion (US$160 million). The other airports which turned a profit were Polonia Medan airport, Sultan Syarif Kasim Pekanbaru airport, Supadio Pontianak airport and Husein Sastra Negara Bandung airport.

Overburdened airports
In 2010, PT Angkasa Pura I combined capacity was 30 million passengers, but it handled 49 million passengers, while PT Angkasa Pura II combined capacity was only 28 million passengers, but it handled 62 million passengers. The most heavily burdened airports were Soekarno-Hatta International Airport, Kualanamu International Airport, Ngurah Rai International Airport and Juanda International Airport.

Hotels
PT Angkasa Pura I will build hotels at Juanda International Airport and Sultan Hasanuddin International Airport in 2011. The investment is Rp.50 billion ($5.8 million) and both hotels will be operated by Accor under the Formule 1 brand.

FLIPMAC
PT Angkasa Pura I will build a Flight Plan and Flow Management Centre (FLIPMAC) in Surabaya to cover also Bali, Makassar and Balikpapan and become the centre of Air Traffic Flow Management (ATFM) nationwide due to Surabaya's point of intersection between domestic and international routes and Jakarta–Surabaya flight path is the world's fifth-most populous and fourth most populous in the Asia Pacific region with 760 flights traffic per week. The system will monitor all the movements of planes from refuelling, baggage, and start catering to aircraft engines and given a time limit and for approaching aircraft, altitude and airspeed settings are also monitored long before the plane arrived at the airport so that aircraft avoid holding or delay. The initial phase will be installed in late 2012 and is expected to be operational in mid-2013 with investment about Rp40 billion.

References

External links 

 Angkasa Pura I - English
 Angkasa Pura II - English

Airport operators
InJourney
Companies based in Jakarta
Transport companies established in 1962
1962 establishments in Indonesia